Capitol Collectors Series may refer to:

 Capitol Collectors Series (Grand Funk Railroad album), 1991
 Capitol Collectors Series (Jo Stafford album), 1991
 Capitol Collectors Series (The Kingston Trio album), 1990
 Capitol Collectors Series (Nat King Cole album), 1990
 Capitol Collectors Series (Peggy Lee album), 1990
 Capitol Collectors Series (Sammy Davis, Jr. album), 1990
 Capitol Collectors Series (Dean Martin album), 1989
 Capitol Collectors Series (Frank Sinatra album), 1989
 Capitol Collectors Series (Raspberries album), 1991
 Capitol Collectors Series (The Seekers album), 1992